Edward Norman "Buckets" Hirsch  (March 26, 1921 – January 28, 2000) was an American gridiron football player who played for the Toronto Argonauts and Hamilton Tiger-Cats. He won the Grey Cup with the Argonauts in 1950. He played college football at Northwestern University. Hirsch also played in the All-America Football Conference (AAFC) from Buffalo Bills from 1947 to 1949.

References

1921 births
2000 deaths
American football fullbacks
American football quarterbacks
American players of Canadian football
Buffalo Bills (AAFC) players
Northwestern Wildcats football players
Toronto Argonauts players
People from Clarence, New York
Players of American football from New York (state)